Alessandro "Sandro" Demaio is an Australian medical doctor, author, TV presenter and executive, with a focus on Public Health and Non-communicable diseases.

Demaio became the CEO of the Victorian Health Promotion Foundation in 2019, having previously worked for the World Health Organization's Department of Nutrition for Health and Development in Geneva as Medical Officer for non-communicable conditions and nutrition, CEO of EAT Foundation

References

External links 
 

Australian public health doctors
Year of birth missing (living people)
Living people